John Cromwell Bell (October 3, 1861 – December 29, 1935) was a distinguished Pennsylvania lawyer, serving as a District Attorney for Philadelphia and state Attorney General.

He was closely involved with football and his alma mater, the University of Pennsylvania.  He served as director of Penn's athletic program, chairman of its football committee, and from 1911 onwards, was a trustee.  He helped found the NCAA, and served on Intercollegiate Football Rules Committee, responsible for the many rules changes made in collegiate football in its early years.

Personal life

His family moved to Philadelphia when he was fourteen.  Bell attended Central High, graduating in 1880 (with an A.B.) and then the University of Pennsylvania Law School, receiving an LL.B. in 1884.
At Penn, he played halfback on the football team for three years.

He married Fleurette de Benneville Keim Myers, daughter of Leonard Myers, a former Congressman, in 1890.  They had two sons.  The elder, John Cromwell, had a distinguished career as attorney, governor, and judge.  The younger, de Benneville, known as Bert, had a distinguished career as football team owner and NFL commissioner.

Career

Bell achieved prominence as an attorney very quickly, and he was noted for his corporate work.  He was offered a judgeship, but declined.

When in 1902 sitting Philadelphia District Attorney John Weaver won election as the city's mayor, Bell accepted the appointment to take his place, and then ran for and won a term on his own, but declined a renomination.  As District Attorney, he was noted for enforcement of food purity laws. He gave the annual address before the Law Academy of Philadelphia: The Several Modes of Instituting Criminal Proceedings in Pennsylvania. An Address...before the Law Academy of Philadelphia, May 27, 1904. (Philadelphia, Dukes, 1904) that gave a useful detailed discussion of how a person might be indicted for criminal proceedings in early twentieth-century Philadelphia.

In 1911, Governor John K. Tener appointed Bell as state Attorney General.  Upon completing his term, Bell returned to private practice.

Bell died of heart disease in 1935.

Further reading

References

1861 births
1935 deaths
19th-century players of American football
American football halfbacks
Penn Quakers football players
Pennsylvania lawyers
Pennsylvania Attorneys General
District Attorneys of Philadelphia
University of Pennsylvania Law School alumni
People from Indiana County, Pennsylvania
Players of American football from Philadelphia
Central High School (Philadelphia) alumni